The Agricultural Conservation Program (ACP) was a United States government program administered by the Farm Service Agency. It was the first conservation cost-sharing program, established by Congress in 1936 in the Soil Conservation and Domestic Allotment Act. The ACP and paid farmers up to $3,500 per year as an incentive to install approved practices for soil conservation and to protect water quality.

The ACP was terminated in the 1996 farm bill and replaced by a new Environmental Quality Incentives Program (EQIP).

References 

Agricultural soil science
New Deal
United States Department of Agriculture programs
Water conservation
Water pollution in the United States